The 2019 German Open (officially known as the Yonex German Open 2020 for sponsorship reasons) was a badminton tournament that took place at the Innogy Sporthalle in Mülheim, Germany, from 26 February to 3 March 2019 and had a total prize of $150,000.

Tournament
The 2019 German Open was the fifth tournament of the 2019 BWF World Tour and also part of the German Open championships, which had been held since 1955. This tournament was organized by the German Badminton Association and sanctioned by the BWF.

Venue
This international tournament was held at the Innogy Sporthalle in Mülheim, North Rhine-Westphalia, Germany.

Point distribution
Below is the point distribution table for each phase of the tournament based on the BWF points system for the BWF World Tour Super 300 event.

Prize money
The total prize money for this tournament was US$150,000. Distribution of prize money was in accordance with BWF regulations.

Men's singles

Seeds

 Kento Momota (champion)
 Chou Tien-chen (semi-finals)
 Kenta Nishimoto (final)
 Lin Dan (second round)
 Ng Ka Long (second round)
 Khosit Phetpradab (first round)
 Kanta Tsuneyama (quarter-finals)
 Kantaphon Wangcharoen (quarter-finals)

Finals

Top half

Section 1

Section 2

Bottom half

Section 3

Section 4

Women's singles

Seeds

 Nozomi Okuhara (semi-finals)
 Akane Yamaguchi (champion)
 Ratchanok Intanon (final)
 Beiwen Zhang (quarter-finals)
 Sayaka Takahashi (quarter-finals)
 Michelle Li (first round)
 Gregoria Mariska Tunjung (first round)
 Han Yue (first round)

Finals

Top half

Section 1

Section 2

Bottom half

Section 3

Section 4

Men's doubles

Seeds

 Takeshi Kamura / Keigo Sonoda (final)
 Hiroyuki Endo / Yuta Watanabe (champions)
 Han Chengkai / Zhou Haodong (second round)
 Takuto Inoue / Yuki Kaneko (first round)
 He Jiting / Tan Qiang (quarter-finals)
 Liao Min-chun / Su Ching-heng (first round)
 Liu Cheng / Zhang Nan (second round)
 Aaron Chia / Soh Wooi Yik (quarter-finals)

Finals

Top half

Section 1

Section 2

Bottom half

Section 3

Section 4

Women's doubles

Seeds

 Yuki Fukushima / Sayaka Hirota (semi-finals)
 Misaki Matsutomo / Ayaka Takahashi (final)
 Mayu Matsumoto / Wakana Nagahara (semi-finals)
 Greysia Polii / Apriyani Rahayu (quarter-finals)
 Chen Qingchen / Jia Yifan (quarter-finals)
 Shiho Tanaka / Koharu Yonemoto (first round)
 Gabriela Stoeva / Stefani Stoeva (quarter-finals)
 Du Yue / Li Yinhui (champions)

Finals

Top half

Section 1

Section 2

Bottom half

Section 3

Section 4

Mixed doubles

Seeds

 Yuta Watanabe / Arisa Higashino (quarter-finals)
 Dechapol Puavaranukroh / Sapsiree Taerattanachai (quarter-finals)
 Chan Peng Soon / Goh Liu Ying (first round)
 He Jiting / Du Yue (quarter-finals)
 Goh Soon Huat / Shevon Jemie Lai (semi-finals)
 Hafiz Faizal / Gloria Emanuelle Widjaja (final)
 Praveen Jordan / Melati Daeva Oktavianti (first round)
 Seo Seung-jae / Chae Yoo-jung (champions)

Finals

Top half

Section 1

Section 2

Bottom half

Section 3

Section 4

References

External links
 Tournament Link

German Open (badminton)
German Open
German Open (badminton)
German Open (badminton)
German Open (badminton)